Preoccupations is the second studio album by Canadian rock band Preoccupations, released on September 16, 2016, by Flemish Eye in Canada and Jagjaguwar in the United States. It was the band's first album released under this name, after changing it from "Viet Cong" in 2015.

Release
The album was preceded by the singles "Anxiety", "Degraded" and "Memory".

Critical reception

Preoccupations received favorable reviews from contemporary music critics. At Metacritic, which assigns a normalized rating out of 100 to reviews from mainstream critics, the album received an average score of 79, based on 21 reviews, which indicates "generally favorable reviews". Writing for Pitchfork, Marc Masters stated, "What makes Preoccupations much more than a circular exercise in self-analysis is the vitality of the music. There’s a tense, nervous energy running through all the tracks, which connect to each other like wires that spark electrical currents when they meet".

Track listing

Personnel
Credits adapted from the liner notes of Preoccupations.

Main personnel
 Matt Flegel – performer, writer
 Mike Wallace – performer, writer
 Scott Munro – performer, writer
 Daniel Christiansen – performer, writer
 Julie Fader – vocals (1, 4)
 Dan Boeckner – vocals (4)
 Jessie Stein – vocals (4), drone (4)
 Graham Walsh – keyboards (7, 9)

Additional personnel
 Graham Walsh – production, mixing, recording
 Matt Flegel – production
 Scott Munro – production, recording
 Paul Gold – mastering
 Pat Flegel – artwork
 Marc Rimmer – design

Charts

References

2016 albums
Preoccupations albums
Jagjaguwar albums
Flemish Eye albums